The Theatre Journal is a quarterly peer-reviewed academic journal covering the theatre arts, with articles from the October and December issues centering on a predetermined theme. It is an official publication of The Association for Theatre in Higher Education and is published on their behalf by the Johns Hopkins University Press.

History 
The journal was established in 1949 as the Educational Theatre Journal and obtained its current name in 1979. The American Educational Theatre Association intended the journal to serve the field of educational theatre and drama in a manner similar to how the Quarterly Journal of Speech and Publications of the Modern Language Association of America served the fields of speech and modern languages respectively. The founding editor-in-chief was Barnard Hewitt (University of Illinois at Urbana–Champaign). Other past editors include Oscar Brockett, James S. Moy, Sue-Ellen Case, Enoch Brater, William B. Worthen, Janelle Reinelt, Loren Kruger, David McDonald, Susan Bennett, David Román, Harry Elam, Jean Graham-Jones, Penny Farfan, Ric Knowles, Joanne Tompkins, and Jennifer Parker-Starbuck.

Abstracting and indexing 
The journal is abstracted and indexed in:

References

External links 
 

Theatre magazines
Arts journals
Quarterly journals
Johns Hopkins University Press academic journals
Publications established in 1949
English-language journals
Academic journals associated with learned and professional societies